Othello (or Ortello), was launched at Liverpool in 1769, possibly under the name Preston. Under the command of Captain James Johnson Othello made two voyages in the African slave trade in 1781 and 1782. She was lost at Tortola in 1783, during the second voyage.

Some general background
Othello entered Lloyd's Register in 1781 with master James Johnson and William Earl (or Earle), owner. Othello had been lengthened in 1770, had undergone a good repair in 1778, and had received a large repair in 1780. At that time her name had been Preston.

Slaver
Othello was armed, and Johnson had received a letter of marque. He sailed from Liverpool on 1 July 1781, bound for Sierra Leone. 

On the way Othello captured St Anne, of 300 tons (bm), which was sailing from Buenos Aires to Cádiz. St Anne was carrying 8,500 dry hides, 180 boxes of Peruvian bark (Cinchona), and four sacks of "fine Spanish wool". The value of the prize was put at £10,000, or £20,000, though it is not clear if that included the vessel as well. The prize-master sailed St Anne to Killybegs in September 1781 where he awaited orders from Heywood. He was concerned about the prevalence of French privateers in the Channel and the coast to Liverpool.

Johnson acquired captives in the Sierra Leone estuary and delivered them to Kingston, Jamaica, on 10 January 1782. Othello had embarked 205 captives and landed 190, for a mortality rate of 7.3%. She had also had one of her 32 crewmen die on the voyage. She arrived back at Liverpool on 23 June.

Loss
On his second voyage, Johnson sailed to the Windward Coast (an old name for the Ivory Coast), leaving Liverpool on 28 August 1782. He acquired captives in the region between the Rio Nuñez and the Assini River, and embarked some 240.

In spring 1783 Johnson's crew mutinied and captured the vessel. The second mate and the doctor recaptured her, but only after Johnson had died while trying to quell the mutiny. The ship was wrecked at Tortola at some point before 8 July. A total of 213 captives were rescued. 

Lloyd's Register for 1783 has her name struck out and the notation "Lost".

Notes, citations, and references
Notes

Citations

References
 
 
 
 

1769 ships
Liverpool slave ships
Age of Sail merchant ships
Merchant ships of the United Kingdom
Maritime incidents in 1783
Maritime incidents involving slave ships